The 2014 Liberty Bowl was an American college football bowl game played on December 29, 2014, at Liberty Bowl Memorial Stadium in Memphis, Tennessee. The 56th edition of the Liberty Bowl, it featured the Texas A&M Aggies of the Southeastern Conference and the West Virginia Mountaineers of the Big 12 Conference.  It began at 1:00 p.m. CST and aired on ESPN.  It was one of the 2014–15 bowl games that concluded the 2014 FBS football season.  Sponsored by automobile parts and accessories store AutoZone, it was officially known as the AutoZone Liberty Bowl.

Teams
This was the first meeting between these two teams. This was the 2nd Liberty Bowl appearance for both schools, Texas A&M's first was in 1975 and West Virginia's was in 1964. This was the first for Texas A&M as a member of the SEC and the first for West Virginia as a member of the Big 12.

Texas A&M

West Virginia

Game summary

Scoring summary

Source:

Statistics

References

Liberty
Liberty Bowl
Texas A&M Aggies football bowl games
West Virginia Mountaineers football bowl games
Liberty Bowl
Liberty Bowl